Namrur (also Romanized as Namrūr, Namarūr, Namarvar, and Namroor; also known as Nām Āvāran, Namrūd, and Nahār Khūrān) is a village in Bedevostan-e Sharqi Rural District of the Central District of Heris County, East Azerbaijan province, Iran. At the 2006 National Census, its population was 1,167 in 300 households. The following census in 2011 counted 1,313 people in 370 households. The latest census in 2016 showed a population of 1,424 people in 424 households; it was the largest village in its rural district.

References 

Heris County

Populated places in East Azerbaijan Province

Populated places in Heris County